Yitzhak Amit (born 20 October 1958) is a judge on the Supreme Court of Israel.

Amit was born and raised in Tel Aviv, Israel. He attended a religious high school and graduated in 1976. He served in the Israel Defense Forces as an officer in Unit 8200, and was discharged in 1980. In 1981, he began studying law at the Hebrew University of Jerusalem and graduated cum laude with an LLB in 1985. He was granted a license to practice law in 1986 and worked as a lawyer in private practice.

In 1997, he was appointed a judge on the Acre Magistrates Court, and subsequently a judge on the Haifa Magistrates Court. He then became a judge on the Haifa District Court. He was elected to the Supreme Court in August 2009, and took office in October 2009. In 2024, Amit is expected to become Chief Justice of the Supreme Court, following Uzi Vogelman's retirement.

References

External links 
Biography on the supreme court webpage

1958 births
Living people
Judges of the Supreme Court of Israel